Hilaire, the French form of Hilary, is a given name and surname derived from the Latin hilarius meaning happy or merry. Notable people with the name include:

People with the surname
 Andrew Hilaire (1899–1935), American jazz drummer
 Laurent Hilaire (born 1962), French ballet dancer and ballet master
 Max Hilaire (born 1985), Haitian professional footballer
 Pierre-Marie Hilaire (born 1965), French athlete
 Ronald Hilaire (born 1984), Canadian gridiron football player and coach
 Vince Hilaire (born 1959), British professional footballer

People with the given name
 Ambroise-Hilaire Comeau (1859–1911), Canadian politician
 Hilaire Babassana, Congolese politician and economist
 Hilaire Belloc (1870–1953), Anglo-French writer
 Hilaire de Barenton (1864–1946), French friar, linguist and historian
 Hilaire du Berrier (1906–2002), American pilot, barnstormer, and spy
 Hilaire de Chardonnet (1839–1924), French engineer and inventor of artificial silk
 Hilaire Cholette (1856–1905), Canadian physician and politician
 Hilaire Couvreur (1924–1998), Belgian cyclist
 Hilaire Deprez (1922–1957), Belgian sprint canoer
 Hilaire Hellebaut (1895–51), Belgian racing cyclist
 Hilaire Hiler (1898–1966), American artist, psychologist, and color theoretician
 Hilaire Hurteau (1837–1920), Canadian notary and political figure
 Hilaire Kédigui (born 1982), Chadian footballer
 Hilaire Mbakop (born 1973), Cameroonian literary scholar and writer
 Hilaire Momi (born 1990), Central African footballer
 Hilaire Neveu (1839–1913), Canadian politician
 Hilaire Noulens, nom de guerre of Jakob Rudnik (1894–1963), Ukrainian-born agent for the Otdel Mezhdunarodny Sviasy
 Hilaire Onwanlélé-Ozimo (born 1968), Gabonese Olympic athlete
 Hilaire Pader (1607–1677), French painter and poet
 Hilaire Penet (born 1501?), French composer
 Hilaire-Bernard de Longepierre (1659–1721), French playwright
 Hilaire Bernard de La Rivière (c. 1640–1729), Canadian architect, attorney, and notary
 Hilaire Rouelle (1718–1779), French chemist
 Hilaire Spanoghe (1879–unknown), Belgian footballer
 Hilaire Vanbiervliet (1890–1981), Belgian painter 
 Jean-Hilaire Aubame (1912–1989), Gabonese politician
 Jean-Hilaire Belloc (1786–1866), French painter

See also
 Saint-Hilaire (disambiguation)

References 

French masculine given names

br:Hilaire
de:Hilaire
fr:Hilaire